Nabila Khashoggi (born 19 February 1962) is an American businesswoman, actress, and philanthropist.

Early life
Nabila Khashoggi was born in Beirut, Lebanon, the eldest child of the late Saudi Arabian arms dealer Adnan Khashoggi and his English former wife, Soraya Khashoggi (born Sandra Patricia Jarvis-Daly). She is the cousin of Dodi Fayed.

Khashoggi was educated at Millfield. Her family moved to England in 1975 to avoid conflict in the region. Her father named one of his yachts 'Nabila' after his daughter (1980).

Career
Khashoggi studied acting with Joanne Baron in Los Angeles, who notably had such students as Jack Nicholson, Robert De Niro and Diane Keaton, and shortly afterward immersed herself in the world of the theatre. While pursuing her acting career, Khashoggi supplemented her income by working on business projects. Eye of the Widow (1991), The Mystery of Edwin Drood (1993), Crack (1994), and Labyrinth (2003) are her most notable film roles.

In 1983 Khashoggi partnered with Bedros Bedrossian, an electrical engineer for the ITT Defense Communications Division, and formed a company called Infolex Corp. This company produced information kiosks for travelers that listed places to eat, entertainment venues and shopping in the area. The information was presented in a variety of languages at a time when the internet was not publicly available. This service was used by hotel chains and airports.

A year later, in 1984, working with her brothers, she embarked on a real estate development venture. Khashoggi sold and developed properties in Spain, England, the United States, France, and South Korea. The siblings also managed and developed a Kenyan tourist camp, as well as worked with developers to create mobile hospital units with much needed medical equipment for war torn areas.

In 2010, Khashoggi founded NabilaK, an online cosmetics, beauty, and home products company. The company was started in 2010, and has a line of skin care and home ambiance products. The brand's stated goal is to promote a healthier lifestyle through natural elements. Nabila K donates a portion of sales to The Children of Peace (ONLUS), an Italian charity that provides education and aid to children in lesser developed countries.

Khashoggi is the author of a series of children's adventure books, including Spartan and the Green Egg a trip to the Rainforest.

Her philanthropic efforts include support for Children for Peace (ONLUS) an Italian charity for impoverished children.

Personal life
In 1992, Khashoggi married British businessman Danny Daggenhurst, chairman of a palm oil company in Bangkok, and son of a former Greek ambassador to Czechoslovakia. They had a son, Spartan. Khashoggi later married James Cox Chambers, an American billionaire heir. She has a second son, with Chambers. They live in New York.

Children's books
2013, Spartan and the Green Egg - Book 1: A Trip to the Rainforest
2014, Spartan and the Green Egg - Book 2: The Reefs of Mindoro Island
2016, Spartan and the Green Egg - Book 3: Adventure at Wadi Allaqi
2018, Spartan and the Green Egg - Book 4: The Poachers of Tiger Mountain

Filmography

References

External links
 

1962 births
Living people
American actresses
Nabila
Actresses from Beirut
People educated at Millfield
Cox family
American people of Saudi Arabian descent
American people of Turkish descent
American people of English descent
American non-fiction writers
Writers from Beirut
Businesspeople from Beirut
People educated at Millfield Preparatory School
21st-century American women